"You Make Me" is a song written and recorded by Swedish DJ and record producer Avicii and Swedish musician and singer Salem Al Fakir in collaboration with Swedish songwriter Vincent Pontare and producer Arash Pournouri. It was produced for Avicii's debut studio album, True and appears as the second track on the album. The song was released as the second single from True on 30 August 2013 as a follow-up to "Wake Me Up". The single made its worldwide debut on BBC Radio 1's The Pete Tong Show on 16 August.

"You Make Me" is written in F sharp major and runs at 125 beats per minute.

Music video
A lyric video for "You Make Me" made by Jesper Eriksson was uploaded to Avicii's VEVO YouTube account on 30 August 2013. The video depicted city scenes (from, among others, Bangkok, Bochum, Chicago and Tokyo) heavily using the miniature photography technique.

The official music video, directed by Sebastian Ringler, premiered on the same channel on 16 September 2013. The video is described by Vevo where "down at the skate rink a little bit of jealousy explodes into ninja battle".

Track listings
Digital download
"You Make Me" – 3:53

Digital download – Remixes
"You Make Me" (Extended Mix) – 5:18
"You Make Me" (Throttle Remix) – 4:45
"You Make Me" (Diplo and Ookay Remix) – 4:07

Commercial performance
"You Make Me" debuted at number five on the UK Singles Chart, one place above Avicii's previous single, "Wake Me Up!", in that week. It remained at number five for a second week. It also debuted at number one on the UK Dance Chart, dethroning "Wake Me Up!" from the top spot.

In the United States, the song debuted and peaked on the Billboard Hot 100 at number eighty-five on the week of October 5, 2013, one week before leaving the chart.

In popular culture
The song was used in the advertising campaign for ITV2's Freshers, a television documentary about Freshers Week at the University of Bedfordshire. It was also used by the TEN Sports network for the cricket match series between India and South Africa in 2013–14.

In April 2014, the song was featured in the Spotify commercial "Can't Find the Words?".

Charts and certifications

Weekly charts

Year-end charts

Certifications

Release history

References

2013 singles
2013 songs
Avicii songs
Number-one singles in Sweden
Song recordings produced by Avicii
Songs written by Arash Pournouri
Songs written by Avicii
Songs written by Salem Al Fakir
Songs written by Vincent Pontare
Universal Music Group singles